Ellis Hooks (born 1974) is an American soul blues and electric blues singer and songwriter, who has released six albums to date.

The Allmusic journalist, Thom Jurek, noted that Hooks " touches upon Wilson Pickett, Sam Cooke, and Otis Redding, but feels like one of the gritty New York streets Hooks has busked upon."

Biography
Hooks was born in Bay Minette, Alabama, United States, to a Cherokee mother and an African American father, who was a Baptist raised sharecropper. He was the thirteenth of sixteen children. By the age of fourteen, Hooks had heard secular music on the radio and left his strict upbringing. Subsequently hitchhiking across the United States, Hooks also travelled around Europe, residing in Paris and Amsterdam, before relocating to New York in his mid-twenties.  After busking on the streets of the city, by accident he met the record producer, Jon Tiven, who produced Hooks debut album, Undeniable. Hooks secured headline status at the BBC's World Music Festival in 2003, and opened for Terence Trent D'Arby.  Hooks also performed with Carla Thomas at the Montreux Jazz Festival. His 2003 album, Up Your Mind, was nominated for a Blues Music Award.

Uncomplicated (2004) was noted by one reviewer as "somehow both connects with the past while pointing ahead to the future".

The Hand of God (2005) was recorded in New York City and Nashville, Tennessee, and had five of its tracks mixed by Dan Penn.

His next recording, Godson of Soul, was also produced by Jon Tiven, and included contributions from Steve Cropper and Wayne Jackson.

Hooks' next release was Another Saturday Morning, issued in July 2007.

Festival work
In May 2004, Hooks performed at Memphis in May.
 
Hooks appeared at the Kitchener Blues Festival in August 2014.

Other recordings
In 2003, Hooks recorded his cover version of "Bulbs" for the Van Morrison tribute album, Vanthology: A Tribute to Van Morrison. In addition, Hooks recorded as a backing vocalist on Frank Black's 2005 album, Honeycomb. He performed similar duties in helping Little Milton record his album Think of Me in 2005. In 2006, Hooks backing vocals were part of Frank Black's release, Fast Man Raider Man.

Hooks' co-composed song "40 Days" was recorded by Howard Tate on his 2008 album, Blue Day; whilst Deborah Coleman had earlier recorded Hooks' co-penned song, "Undeniable", for her What About Love? (2004) release.

Discography

Studio albums

See also
List of electric blues musicians
List of soul-blues musicians

References

External links
Zane Records : Ellis Hooks discography

1974 births
Living people
American soul singers
American blues singers
People from Bay Minette, Alabama
Electric blues musicians
Soul-blues musicians
Songwriters from Alabama
21st-century American singers
21st-century American male singers
American male songwriters